Samuel Bernstein (1898–1987) was an American historian born in France. His field of study was history of social movements. His 1933 work The Beginnings of Marxian Socialism in France was a reworking of his thesis and has been criticized for its very narrow scope.

Works
 The Beginnings of Marxian Socialism in France. New York: Elliot Publishing Co., 1933.
 Jefferson and the French Revolution. New York: Science and Society, 1943.
 Filippo Buonarroti. Torino, Italy: G. Einaudi, 1946.
 A Centenary of Marxism. New York: Science and Society, 1948.
 Buonarroti. Paris: Hier et aujourd'hui, 1949.
 Contribution á lh̓istoire du socialisme en France: De la Révolution de 1789 á la Commune de 1871. Paris: Editions Hier et Aujourdʻhui, 1949.
 Essays in Political and Intellectual History. New York: Paine-Whitman, 1955.
 Amerikanische Freunde der franzȯsischen Revolution. Berlin: Rütten and Loening, 1958.
 The First International in America. New York: Augustus M. Kelley, 1962.
 Storia del socialismo in Francia: Dall'Illuminismo alla commune. Rome: Editori Riuniti, 1963.
 Blanqui. Paris: F. Maspero, 1970.
 Auguste Blanqui and the Art of Insurrection. London: Lawrence and Wishart, 1971.
 Babeuf's Conspiracy Viewed by the Press of the United States. Assen,  the Netherlands: Royal VanGorcum, 1975.
 French Political and Intellectual History. New York: Paine-Whitman Publishers, 1984.
 Joel Barlow: A Connecticut Yankee in an Age of Revolution. New York: Rutledge Books, 1985.

References

External links
International Dictionary of Intellectual Historians

1898 births
1987 deaths
Social historians
French emigrants to the United States
American historians